Gemma Chan (born 29 November 1982) is an English actress. Born and raised in London, Chan attended the Newstead Wood School for Girls and studied law at Worcester College, Oxford before choosing to pursue a career in acting instead, enrolling at the Drama Centre London. Chan was subsequently cast in various supporting roles on television, including Doctor Who, Sherlock, Secret Diary of a Call Girl, Fresh Meat, Bedlam and True Love. She appeared in independent films Exam (2009), Submarine (2010) and Belles Familles (2015). Chan performed in the British premiere of Yellow Face at The Park Theatre and Our Ajax at the Southwark Playhouse. 

Chan had minor roles in Jack Ryan: Shadow Recruit (2014), Fantastic Beasts and Where to Find Them (2016) and Transformers: The Last Knight (2017). She starred as a servile anthropomorph in the science fiction series Humans (2015–2018) to critical praise. Chan gained widespread recognition for portraying Astrid Leong-Teo in Jon M. Chu's romantic comedy Crazy Rich Asians (2018), which became a critical and commercial hit. Chan along with the ensemble was nominated for the Screen Actors Guild Award for Outstanding Cast in a Motion Picture. Chan played Bess of Hardwick in the historical drama Mary Queen of Scots (2018) and voiced the antagonist Namaari in Disney's animated film Raya and the Last Dragon (2021). In Marvel Studios' Marvel Cinematic Universe (MCU), Chan portrayed Minn-Erva in Captain Marvel (2019) before headlining Eternals (2021) as Sersi.

Early life
Gemma Chan was born at Guy's Hospital in London, England. Her father was an engineer who grew up in Hong Kong and her mother was a pharmacist and raised in Greenock, Scotland, after her parents emigrated from Hong Kong.

Raised in Locksbottom in the London Borough of Bromley, Chan attended Newstead Wood School for Girls in Orpington, London and went on to study law at Worcester College, Oxford. Following graduation, Chan gained a training contract offer as a graduate at the law firm Slaughter and May, but turned it down to study at the Drama Centre London and pursue an acting career.

Career

2006–2013: Early career

Chan made her professional debut in Horror Channel's 2006 miniseries When Evil Calls. She was a competitor on the first series of the reality series Project Catwalk. Chan made her stage debut in the British premiere of Bertolt Brecht's last play, Turandot, at the Hampstead Theatre, London, in 2008.  Chan appeared in the autumn 2009 special of the BBC's Doctor Who, titled "The Waters of Mars", playing geologist Mia Bennett. The episode later won a Hugo Award. In the same year, Chan starred in Exam (2009) which premiered at the Edinburgh International Film Festival to mixed reviews. The following year, Chan appeared in two episodes in Channel 4's The IT Crowd. In Season 4, Episode 2 "The Final Countdown", she portrays "Ivana", a sexy girl in a club with whom Moss had slept with previously. The episode also stars fellow Marvel actor Benedict Wong as "Prime". She appears again in Season 4, Episode 6 "Reynholm vs Reynholm", a Star Trek parody as "female Sulu". 

Also in 2010, she got one of her first breakout roles, as a heavily accented Chinese immigrant appearing in The Blind Banker, a first series episode of BBC's Sherlock. The episode was criticized partly because of its orientalist clichés. Chan's next releases, Pimp, (2010) and Shanghai (2010), were panned by critics, while Submarine premiered at the 35th Toronto International Film Festival to positive reviews. Chan was cast as a series regular in the final series of Secret Diary of a Call Girl, as the rival of Billie Piper's character. The series aired on ITV2 in 2011.

Later that year, she appeared in Channel 4's Fresh Meat. A supporter of human rights, she made a film for Amnesty International to celebrate the 60th anniversary of the Universal Declaration of Human Rights. In 2012, Chan was a regular in series two of Sky Living's supernatural drama Bedlam where she portrayed Kiera, an "impulsive" and "free spirited" woman. She appeared in True Love, a five-part semi-improvised television series produced by Working Title for BBC One. Chan met her co-stars on set, and had free rein to "flesh out" her character during the written scenarios. In June 2013, Chan performed in the British premiere of Yellow Face by American playwright David Henry Hwang at The Park Theatre, London, and returned for its 2014 revival at the Royal National Theatre. While promoting the play, Chan spoke about her struggles to get cast in non Chinese-related productions and period dramas due to her ethnicity.

In November 2013, Chan performed in the world premiere of Our Ajax by Timberlake Wertenbaker at the Southwark Playhouse, London. Wertenbaker chose her to play the war goddess Athena after she saw her performance in Yellow Face. Michael Billington of The Guardian described her performance as "beautifully svelte omniscience". Later that year, she starred in BBC One crime drama Shetland, playing young archaeologist Hattie James. Chan guest-starred in the BBC's Death in Paradise. She was a cast member of Channel 4 romantic drama Dates. On 6 August 2013, Chan appeared as a guest on the "Cultural Exchange" feature of the BBC Radio 4 series Front Row, where she nominated the film The Princess Bride as a film she loves. Chan appeared in The Double (2013), which premiered at the 2013 Toronto International Film Festival to critical success.

2014–2019: Breakthrough

Chan appeared in the action-thriller  Jack Ryan: Shadow Recruit (2014), which met mixed reception and financial success. She portrayed the protagonist's girlfriend, Chen-Lin, in French comedy-drama Belles Familles (2015), which was released at the 2015 Toronto International Film Festival. Chan portrayed American witch Madame Ya Zhou in Fantastic Beasts and Where to Find Them (2016), which was nominated for five BAFTAs.
 She lent her voice to BBC's animated miniseries Watership Down in 2018. Chan starred as the anthropomorphic robot Anita/Mia in Humans, an AMC/Channel 4 science-fiction drama, from 2015 to 2018. The A.V. Club wrote that Chan "anchors the series", with her performance "awakening in ways both subtle and overt ... to reflect every new emotion." Chan voiced robot Quintessa in Transformers: The Last Knight (2017), which was panned by critics. Chan starred in action-thriller Stratton (2017) as the titular character's "smart-girl" colleague, Aggie. In 2018, Chan joined Andrea Riseborough, Jane Horrocks, Jaime Winstone, and Laura Carmichael to star in a film produced by ActionAid, encouraging the British public to support girls at risk of sexual violence. 

Also in 2018, Chan co-starred as Astrid Leong-Teo in the film Crazy Rich Asians. Originally asked to portray the lead, Chan preferred the "more intriguing" role of Astrid. She first heard about the novel Crazy Rich Asians in a text message from her sister, read it on holiday, and "fell in love with Astrid". On her role, Chan stated that "what you see with Astrid is not necessarily what you get. There are layers to her ... [she] seemingly has it all together. The film became the highest-grossing romantic comedy of the decade and received critical acclaim for its cast, visuals and on-screen representation. The Hollywood Reporter lauded Chan as "a radiant presence who lights up her every scene". 

That same year, she featured in the short film titled Leading Lady Parts in support of the Time's Up movement. Chan appeared as  Petronella in London Fields (2018), which was a box-office bomb. Chan portrayed Elizabeth Hardwick in Josie Rourke's directorial debut, historical drama Mary Queen of Scots (2018), which premiered at the AFI Fest. Chan's casting "provoked controversy among internet trolls", as her character had been a white woman. Chan responded that "if John Wayne can play Genghis Khan, I can play Bess of Hardwick" and remarked that "art should reflect life now." Chan appeared in Captain Marvel (2019) in a supporting role as Minn-Erva, a sniper who is part of the Kree Starforce. The role required an extensive amount of prosthetic makeup, described as "four layers of airbrush paint" that took four hours to apply. The film had the sixth-biggest opening of all time to critical success. That same year, she was one of fifteen women selected to appear on the cover of the September 2019 issue of British Vogue, by guest editor Meghan, Duchess of Sussex.

2020–present: Let Them All Talk and Eternals
In 2020 Chan starred alongside Meryl Streep in Steven Soderbergh's comedy Let Them All Talk. She portrayed Karen, a literary agent who has a "maybe-romance" with her client's nephew. The film premiered on HBO Max to positive reception. That same year, Chan was the fifteenth recipient of the Women In Film Max Mara Face of the Future award, given for her "distinguished acting achievements" and "personal embodiment of timeless style and grace". Chan voiced the warrior princess Namaari, the antagonist of the Disney animated film Raya and the Last Dragon, which premiered in March 2021. The film was received positively by critics. That May, she briefly produced Hold Still, Vincent, a podcast about the 1982 murder of Vincent Chin. It was subsequently pulled from distribution by the producing team after it was revealed that the podcast's production company did not consult with Chin's estate during the project. November 2021 saw the release of the Marvel Studios film Eternals, in which she starred as Sersi, a member of the titular race. This was her second role in the Marvel Cinematic Universe after Captain Marvel (2019).

Chan will reprise her roles in the two Crazy Rich Asians sequel installments, China Rich Girlfriend and Rich People Problems. Chan appears in psychological thriller Don't Worry Darling directed by Olivia Wilde and will appear in science fiction film True Love directed by Gareth Edwards, and horror film Cuckoo, alongside Hunter Schafer and John Malkovich. She will star in the Apple TV+ anthology series Extrapolations. In 2022, she was cast in Duke Johnson's upcoming film The Actor, based on the novel Memory by Donald E. Westlake.

Advocacy and activism
Chan travelled with Save the Children to Lebanon to meet Syrian child refugees in 2017. In 2018 she partnered with Moet to support Help Refugees UK. She volunteered for Cook-19, an organization that delivers meals to key workers, during the COVID-19 pandemic. Chan has supported UNICEF UK since 2015 and travelled to Jamaica to raise awareness of domestic violence with the organisation in 2019. She participated in Soccer Aid to raise funds for the charity in 2019. She participated in World Children's Day commemorations in 2020. She was appointed a celebrity ambassador for UNICEF UK in 2021.

In response to the xenophobic and racist attacks against people of East and Southeast Asian descent during the COVID-19 pandemic, Chan advocated for the #StopAAPIhate movement and fundraising campaign. In May 2021 Chan launched the #StopESEAHate campaign to assist people of East and Southeast Asian descent who are victims of hate crimes.

Personal life
Chan dated English comedian Jack Whitehall from 2011 to 2017. She began a relationship with English actor Dominic Cooper in 2018. They reside together in London.

In September 2013 Chan appeared at the Old Bailey in central London as a witness to a fatal stabbing outside Putney Bridge tube station.

Politics
Chan and her partner Dominic Cooper participated in the People's Vote March, expressing support for a second Brexit referendum, in October 2018. She has criticised both the Conservative and Labour parties for their processes in choosing leadership.

Filmography

Film

Television

Theatre

Awards and nominations

Authored articles

References

External links

 
 Gemma Chan at Rotten Tomatoes

1982 births
21st-century English actresses
Actresses from London
Alumni of the Drama Centre London
Alumni of Worcester College, Oxford
British actresses of Chinese descent
English film actresses
English television actresses
English voice actresses
English people of Hong Kong descent
Living people
People educated at Newstead Wood School
People from the London Borough of Bromley